Yassamine Mather is an Iranian scholar and political activist. She was an SCR Member of St Antony's College, University of Oxford 2018-2022 and the acting editor of Critique: Journal of Socialist Theory. 
On 29 March 2014, Mather was elected to Left Unity's National Council at the party's first policy conference.
She is the chair of the Hands Off the People of Iran (HOPI).

Scholarly work 
Yassamine Mather has authored numerous journal articles. The latter explore, among others, politics in Iran and the Middle East in general.

Media presence 
Mather has been contributing to debates broadcast, among others, by BBC Persian and Radio NZ.

Selected list of scholarly publications 

 Slaughter, Cliff; Slaughter, Vivien; Mather, Yassamine (2018-11-12). Women And The Social Revolution (1st edition ed.). Spiderwize.
Mather, Yassamine (2018-07-03). "The political economy of Iran's Islamic state, Donald Trump and threats of war". Critique. 46 (3): 443–469.
 Mather, Yassamine (2015-10-02). "The Middle East in the Midst of a Policy of Confusion and Muddle: Part 1". Critique. 43 (3–4): 347–363.
 Mather, Yassamine (2015-10-02). "The Middle East in the Midst of a Policy of Confusion and Muddle: Part 2". Critique. 43 (3–4): 365–373.
Mather, Yassamine (2011-12-01). "Iran's Tudeh Party: A History of Compromises and Betrayals". Critique. 39 (4): 611–627.

References

Living people
Iranian political scientists
Alumni of the University of St Andrews
Alumni of the University of Manchester
People associated with the University of Oxford
Academic journal editors
Iranian socialists
Iranian women activists
Date of birth missing (living people)
Place of birth missing (living people)
British people of Iranian descent
British women activists
British socialists
Women political scientists
Year of birth missing (living people)